Psalm 52 is the 52nd psalm of the Book of Psalms, beginning in English in the King James Version: "Why boastest thou thyself in mischief, O mighty man?". In the slightly different numbering system used in the Greek Septuagint and Latin Vulgate translations of the Bible, this psalm is Psalm 51. In Latin, it is known as "Quid gloriatur in malitia", It is described as a maskil, attributed to David, and is said to have been written "when Doeg the Edomite went and told Saul, and said to him, "David has gone to the house of Ahimelech". In this psalm, David criticises those who use their talents for evil.

The psalm forms a regular part of Jewish, Catholic, Eastern Orthodox and Protestant liturgies.

Text

Hebrew Bible version 
The following is the Hebrew text of Psalm 52:

King James Version 
 Why boastest thou thyself in mischief, O mighty man? the goodness of God endureth continually.
 Thy tongue deviseth mischiefs; like a sharp razor, working deceitfully.
 Thou lovest evil more than good; and lying rather than to speak righteousness. Selah.
 Thou lovest all devouring words, O thou deceitful tongue.
 God shall likewise destroy thee for ever, he shall take thee away, and pluck thee out of thy dwelling place, and root thee out of the land of the living. Selah.
 The righteous also shall see, and fear, and shall laugh at him:
 Lo, this is the man that made not God his strength; but trusted in the abundance of his riches, and strengthened himself in his wickedness.
 But I am like a green olive tree in the house of God: I trust in the mercy of God for ever and ever.
 I will praise thee for ever, because thou hast done it: and I will wait on thy name; for it is good before thy saints.

Context 
The psalm's sub-heading refers to the occasion reported in 1 Samuel 21–22 when Doeg, the chief herdsman of Saul, the first king of Israel, informed Saul that David had been received by Ahimelech at Nob, a priestly town in the vicinity of Jerusalem, and assisted with the means for his flight. Alexander Kirkpatrick observes that "the character denounced in the Psalm is in some respects such as we may suppose Doeg to have been. He was a man of wealth and importance as the chief of Saul’s herdmen (or, according to the LXX, the keeper of his mules). His tongue was "a deceitful tongue", because although the facts he reported were true, he helped to confirm Saul in a false and cruel suspicion.

However, Kirkpatrick notes that

Instead, he argues that

Latin divisions
This psalm opens the second section of the three traditional divisions of the Latin psalter, and for this reason the first words (Quid gloriatur in malitia qui potens est iniquitate...), and above all the initial "Q", were often greatly enlarged in illuminated manuscript psalters, following the pattern of the Beatus initials at the start of Psalm 1, and the "D" of Psalm 102.

Psalm form
According to Hermann Gunkel's system of classification, Psalm 52 was conditionally classified as an Individual Psalm of Trust, one that demonstrates an expression of trust or confidence in YHWH's assistant to the petitioner.

Book of Common Prayer
In the Church of England's Book of Common Prayer, this psalm is appointed to be read on the morning of the tenth day of the month.

Musical settings 
Heinrich Schütz wrote a setting of a paraphrase of Psalm 52 in German, "Was trotzst denn du, Tyrann, so hoch", SWV 149, for the Becker Psalter, published first in 1628.

References

External links 

 
 
 Text of Psalm 52 according to the 1928 Psalter
 Psalms Chapter 52 text in Hebrew and English, mechon-mamre.org
 Tehillim — Psalms 52 (Judaica Press) translation with Rashi's commentary at Chabad.org
 For the leader. A maskil of David, when Doeg the Edomite entered and reported to Saul, saying to him: “David has entered the house of Ahimelech." / Why do you glory in what is evil, you who are mighty by the mercy of God? text and footnotes, usccb.org United States Conference of Catholic Bishops
 Psalm 52:1 introduction and text, biblestudytools.com
 Psalm 52 – Praying About the Man Who Loved Evil enduringword.com
 Psalm 52 / Refrain: I trust in the goodness of God for ever and ever. Church of England
 Psalm 52 at biblegateway.com
 Hymns for Psalm 52 hymnary.org

052
Works attributed to David